Star Search Croatia  was the second Croatian version of Pop Idol and it was airing on RTL Televizija.

In the first season the competitors were judged by Croatian musicians Tony Cetinski, Jelena Radan and Goran Lisica - Fox. Due to private commitments Radan left in the beginning of the second season and was replaced by Anđa Marić who left after the second season and was replaced with Ivana Mišerić in the third season

Antonija Blaće, famous for participating and hosting the Croatian Big Brother edition is the host of the competition which makes her the first person ever to host the two local versions of these franchises. Due to hosting Big Brother in Spring 2011 she was replaced with Ivan Šarić.

Season 1 
Season 1 was aired from February to June 2009 and was won by Bojan Jambrošić.

Season 2 
The second season was aired from April to June 2010 and was won by Kim Verson.

External links
 Official website
 Unofficial fansite

Croatian popular music
Croatian reality television series
Idols (franchise)
2009 Croatian television series debuts
Television series by Fremantle (company)
Non-British television series based on British television series
RTL (Croatian TV channel) original programming